The Invasion of Buhran occurred in 3 A.H of the Islamic calendar of the 4th or 5th month. A report had arrived to the Muslims that a formidable force of the Banu Sulaym from Buhran were advancing on Madinah. Muhammad, took 300 men, to Hijaz reaching to Buhran, where the Banu Sulaym fled in panic.

Throughout the expedition, they did not meet any enemies, and no fighting took place. The expedition is regarded as a "patrolling invasion", according to Muslim scholar Saifur Rahman al-Mubarakpuri.

This event is mentioned in Ibn Hisham's biography of Muhammad and modern Islamic sources such as Ar-Raheeq Al-Makhtum by Saifur Rahman Al-Mubarakpuri.

See also
List of expeditions of Muhammad

Notes

624
Campaigns led by Muhammad
Invasions